Anastassya Kudinova (born February 27, 1988) is a Kazakhstani sprinter. She competed at the 2016 Summer Olympics in the women's 400 metres race; her time of 56.03 seconds in the heats did not qualify her for the semifinals. She failed an out-of-competition doping test in July 2016 and was given a four-year ban started from 17 August that year and had her Olympic performance annulled.

She was the long jump silver medallist at the 2012 Asian Indoor Athletics Championships and won individual and relay 400 metres medals at the 2015 Asian Athletics Championships.

International competitions

References

External links

1988 births
Living people
Kazakhstani female sprinters
Kazakhstani female long jumpers
Olympic athletes of Kazakhstan
Athletes (track and field) at the 2016 Summer Olympics
Doping cases in athletics
Kazakhstani sportspeople in doping cases
20th-century Kazakhstani women
21st-century Kazakhstani women